Notaras was a Greek aristocratic family. Tracing their origins back to the Byzantine period from Monemvasia, together with Lucas Notaras as the last megas doux of the Byzantine Empire, they gave several religious to the Greek Orthodox Church, several politicians to the Greek kingdom and a dynasty of artists to Romania.

Notable members
Loukas Notaras (1402–1453), the last megas doux of the Byzantine Empire
Jacob Notaras (c. 1439–1491)
Saint Gerasimus of Kefalonia (1506–1579), patron-saint of Greek island Kefalonia
Anna Notaras (died 1507), daughter of Loukas Notaras, the last megas doux of the Byzantine Empire
Ioannis Notaras (died 1827), general in the Greek War of Independence
Panoutsos Notaras, political leader in the Greek War of Independence
Dositheos Notaras (1641–1707), Greek Orthodox Patriarch of Jerusalem
Notara (first name unknown), onetime owner of the Guilford Puteal
John Notaras (1939-2013), Australian businessman with interests in retail, property and wool growing, Honorary Ambassador of Canberra 

Greek noble families
Byzantine families